Lukáš Tóth (born 9 January 1996), is a Slovak professional footballer who plays for Slavoj Trebišov as a midfielder.

Club career
He made his professional Fortuna Liga debut for Zemplín Michalovce against ŽP Šport Podbrezová on 24 October 2015.

References

External links
 MFK Zemplín Michalovce official profile
 Futbalnet profile
 

1996 births
Living people
Slovak footballers
Association football midfielders
MFK Zemplín Michalovce players
FC Lokomotíva Košice players
FK Poprad players
FK Slavoj Trebišov players
Slovak Super Liga players
2. Liga (Slovakia) players
People from Vranov nad Topľou
Sportspeople from the Prešov Region